The 1970 WANFL season was the 86th season of the Western Australian National Football League. After four years of dominance by the three Perth clubs, 1970 saw 1969 wooden spooners South Fremantle, aided by a tough pre-season training program under coach “Hassa” Mann (a three-time Melbourne premiership player) and the arrival of Len Clark and John O‘Reilly from the VFL, rise to take their first premiership since the 1947–1954 dynasty. The Bulldogs (as the club had recently become known) upset Perth in two finals in wet conditions, while 1969 premiers West Perth fell to sixth with only ten victories: indeed this was the first season since 1955 with East Perth that legendary ruckman “Polly” Farmer had played for a team that missed the finals. The Cardinals were affected by the loss of John Wynne to Norwood, backup ruckmen Brian Sampson and Neil Evans to retirement and Greg Astbury to a major stomach problem, plus a dispute over Bill Valli, whose clearance to Collingwood was refused by the WANFL and the club's severe lack of depth in its reserves. Of the lower sides from previous seasons, in addition to South Fremantle's surprise flag Claremont showed major improvement due to such young players as Moss, winning more games than in any season since 1965, and would have done much better but for long-term injuries to rover Bruce Duperouzel and centre half-forward Lindsay Carroll in the second half of the season, when they fell out of the four after looking like a second semi-final berth.

Despite a much wetter winter than the drought year of 1969, scoring in 1970 was higher than ever before, exceeding 100 points per team per game for the first time, including a record highest losing score. This was largely due to the “out of bounds on the full” rule which the WANFL adopted for the first time after its success in the 1969 VFL season. Attendances for the home-and-away season also hit a never-to-be-equalled average of 9,644 per match, aided by South's revival. The season, unusually, lasted a week beyond the conclusion of the senior premiership due to a draw in the reserves Grand Final between East Fremantle and Subiaco.

Although Swan Districts finished with its second wooden spoon in three seasons, captain-coach Bill Walker – whose coaching was often severely criticised – became the only player to win four Sandover Medals when awarded a retrospective Medal by Westar Rules in 1997.

Home-and-away season

Round 1

Round 2

Round 3

Interstate Trial

Round 4

Round 5

Round 6

Round 7

Round 8 (Foundation Day)

Round 9

Round 10

Round 11

Round 12

Round 13

Round 14

Interstate match

Round 15

Round 16

Round 17

Round 18

Round 19

Round 20

Round 21

Ladder

Finals

First semi-final

Second semi-final

Preliminary final

Grand Final

Notes
Walker lost on a countback, but was retrospectively awarded a Medal by the Westar Rules hierarchy in 1997.This policy was made illegal in 1973 when a ‘centre diamond’ (later the current centre square) was introduced, within with no team could place more than four players during a centre bounce.East Fremantle were not to suffer another wooden spoon after their debut until 2004, and they did so again in 2006.

References

External links
Official WAFL website
Western Australian National Football League (WANFL), 1970

West Australian Football League seasons
WANFL